The Great Dąbrowa (Polish: Jezioro Dąbrowa Wielka, German: Groß Damerau See) is a lake in Poland near the gmina Dąbrówno. The Little Dąbrowa lake is nearby.

Lakes of Poland
Lakes of Warmian-Masurian Voivodeship